The Bayad are a Muslim community found in the state of Gujarat in India.

History and origin

The community get their name from the village of Bayad in Aravalli District, and are Rajput converts to Islam. According to their traditions, they accompanied a Rajput prince as he re-established his control over the Dantha state. They originated in Kakiani in Rajasthan, and said to have converted to Islam some five hundred years ago. They are now found mainly in the town of Anjar, with a small number are found in Bhuj. At the partition of India in 1947, a large portion of the tribe moved to Pakistan, and are settled in the districts of Sanghar and Badin.

Present circumstances

The Bayad are an endogamous community, but their some cases of intermarriage with neighbouring Samma communities. There traditional occupation was military services in the princely state of Kutch, with agriculture being their secondary occupation. Most are now small and medium-sized farmers, with the selling of milk being secondary occupation. The community has a caste association, the Bayad Jamat based in the town of Anjar, and its main function is the general welfare of the community. They are Sunni Muslims, and their customs are similar to neighbouring Muslim communities such as the Halaypotra.

References

Social groups of Gujarat
Tribes of Kutch
Maldhari communities
Muslim communities of India
Sindhi tribes

Sindhi tribes in India
Muslim communities of Gujarat